was a Japanese educator, academic administrator and government official.

Biography
He was selected as a member of the House of Peers in 1909. In 1911, he became the first president of Tohoku University in Sendai City. In 1913, he was appointed the president of Kyoto University. He is best known for writing the Revised Elementary School Code of 1900.

References

External links
Portraits of modern Japanese historical figures
JSTOR
Research Gate
Seijo University

1865 births
1927 deaths
Japanese academic administrators
Japanese government officials
Japanese politicians
Presidents of Kyoto University
19th-century Japanese educators
20th-century Japanese educators
University and college founders